Alain Dejammet is a former Permanent Representative of France to the United Nations. Before that he was ambassador of France to Egypt.

Biography

Books 
 Supplément au voyage en Onusie, Fayard, 2003.

References

External links
C-SPAN Appearances

Ambassadors of France to Egypt
Permanent Representatives of France to the United Nations
Living people
Year of birth missing (living people)
Place of birth missing (living people)